Eubela awakinoensis is an extinct species of sea snail, a marine gastropod mollusk in the family Raphitomidae.

Description

Distribution

References

 Powell, Arthur William Baden. The New Zealand Recent and Fossil Mollusca of the Family Turridae: With General Notes on Turrid Nomenclature and Systematics. No. 2. Unity Press limited, printers, 1942.
 Powell, A. W. B., 1966. The molluscan families Speightiidae and Turridae, an evaluation of the valid taxa, both Recent and fossil, with list of characteristic species. Bulletin of the Auckland Institute and Museum, 5:1-184
 Maxwell, P.A. (2009). Cenozoic Mollusca. pp 232–254 in Gordon, D.P. (ed.) New Zealand inventory of biodiversity. Volume one. Kingdom Animalia: Radiata, Lophotrochozoa, Deuterostomia. Canterbury University Press, Christchurch.

awakinoensis
Gastropods described in 1942